Ivan Shvedoff (born 21 September 1969) is a Russian actor.

Biography 
Shvedoff was born in Leningrad (now Saint Petersburg) in the Russian SFSR.

Shvedoff first started his acting career as a theater actor in the Theater of Youth Creativity (1979-1986).

He studied acting at the Saint Petersburg State Theatre Arts Academy from 1987 to 1991, and made his film debut in The Chekist in 1992. Shvedoff has lived in Prague since the late 1990s.

He has appeared in several Hollywood films usually as Russian or Eastern Bloc characters, including Enemy at the Gates, The Bourne Supremacy and Mission: Impossible – Ghost Protocol. He was also a Russian dialog coach for Matt Damon in The Bourne Identity.

Filmography

References

External links

1969 births
Living people
Russian male film actors
Male actors from Saint Petersburg
Russian State Institute of Performing Arts alumni